T Madhava Menon (Thelakkat Madhava Menon, born 19 November 1929) is a former civil servant in the Indian Administrative Service (Kerala Cadre) who has held various posts including that of District Collector, Palakkad, Director of Administration, Central PWD, New Delhi, Custodian, Vested (Nationalised) Forests, Kerala, Director of Tribal Welfare, Kerala and Vice-Chancellor, Kerala Agricultural University. After retirement, he was associated with the People of India Project and was the Co-Editor of the volumes related to Kerala. He is  a Senior Fellow of International School of Dravidian Linguistics where he edited a three volume Encyclopaedia on Dravidian Tribes. He also edited a two-volume Handbook of Kerala. He is also a member of the Governing Council of Attappady Hill Areas Development Society.

On 1 November 2022, the Kerala Piravi day, Government of Kerala announced the conferment of the first ever Kerala Prabha award on T Madhava Menon in recognition of his social work.

Selected publications

The Encyclopaedia of Dravidian Tribes, International School of Dravidian Linguistics, 1996 (Editor)
Tribal Development in India: From Despair to Hope, B.R. Publishing Corporation, 2020
Kerala Pazhama: Antiquity of Kerala, Hermann Gundert, translation into English by T Madhava Menon, International School of Dravidian Linguistics, 2003
People of India : Kerala : Volume XXVII (3 Parts-Set), edited by T Madhava Menon, Deepak Tyagi and B. Francis Kulirani, 2002
Keralolpathy, translation into English by T Madhava Menon, International School of Dravidian Linguistics

References

Dravidian studies
Anthropologists
Indian anthropologists
Indian Administrative Service officers
Kerala Prabha Award Winners